Eldred Township is a township in McKean County, Pennsylvania, United States.  The population was 1,382 at the 2020 census.

History
Eldred Township, like the borough of Eldred, Pennsylvania is named for Judge Nathaniel B. Eldred.

Geography

Demographics

As of the census of 2000, there were 1,696 people, 686 households, and 487 families residing in the township.  The population density was 43.1 people per square mile (16.6/km2).  There were 783 housing units at an average density of 19.9/sq mi (7.7/km2).  The racial makeup of the township was 99.35% White, 0.12% African American, 0.06% Native American, 0.06% Asian, and 0.41% from two or more races. Hispanic or Latino of any race were 0.06% of the population.

There were 686 households, out of which 30.6% had children under the age of 18 living with them, 58.2% were married couples living together, 7.7% had a female householder with no husband present, and 28.9% were non-families. 24.3% of all households were made up of individuals, and 9.6% had someone living alone who was 65 years of age or older.  The average household size was 2.47 and the average family size was 2.93.

In the township the population was spread out, with 24.6% under the age of 18, 6.7% from 18 to 24, 27.8% from 25 to 44, 29.0% from 45 to 64, and 12.0% who were 65 years of age or older.  The median age was 39 years. For every 100 females there were 99.8 males.  For every 100 females age 18 and over, there were 95.7 males.

The median income for a household in the township was $33,750, and the median income for a family was $40,278. Males had a median income of $31,105 versus $22,241 for females. The per capita income for the township was $15,361.  About 11.2% of families and 13.4% of the population were below the poverty line, including 17.7% of those under age 18 and 7.8% of those age 65 or over.

References

Populated places established in 1785
Townships in McKean County, Pennsylvania
1785 establishments in Pennsylvania